Prince Alberto of Naples and Sicily (Alberto Lodovico Maria Filipo Gaetano; 2 May 1792 – 25 December 1798) was a Prince of Naples and Sicily as the son of Ferdinand I of the Two Sicilies and his wife, Maria Carolina. He died on board , a British Royal Navy vessel.

Biography

Born to Ferdinand VI of Naples, he was the sixteenth child born to his parents and their seventh son. His mother was a daughter of Empress Maria Theresa and thus a sister of Marie Antoinette. From his birth he was third in line to the Neapolitan throne after his brothers Prince Francis, then Duke of Calabria, and the Prince of Salerno.

A member of the Bourbons of Naples, he was a Prince of Naples and Sicily by birth. He was born in Naples and baptised Alberto Lodovico Maria Filipo Gaetano.

His brothers included Prince Carlo, Duke of Calabria, who died of smallpox in 1778; the future King Francis and Prince Leopold, Prince of Salerno.

His older sisters included the future Holy Roman Empress, Grand Duchess of Tuscany, Princess Maria Cristina, who was the wife of the future Charles Felix of Sardinia and Queen of Sardinia; Maria Cristina's twin Princess Maria Cristina Amelia died in 1783 of smallpox. Another sister was the Queen of the French<ref name="Marie Amelie">Dyson. C.C, The Life of Marie Amelie Last Queen of the French, 1782–1866, BiblioBazaar, LLC, 2008, p. 50'.</ref> and the last surviving daughter was the future Princess of Asturias.

His cousins included the Duke of Parma, Grand Duke of Tuscany, Holy Roman Emperor, Queen of Portugal, King of Spain and a Duchess of Calabria, the first wife of his brother Francis.

On the outbreak of the French Revolution in 1789 the Neapolitan court was not hostile to the movement. When the French monarchy was abolished and Alberto's aunt and uncle were executed, his parents joined the First Coalition against France in 1793, a year after Alberto's birth.

Although peace was made with France in 1796, by 1798 conflict was again fierce. It was decided that the royal family flee to the Kingdom of Sicily. The family left Naples on 21 December 1798 on board , a British Royal Navy vessel which was in turn protected by two Neapolitan warships.

It was on board Vanguard'' that Alberto died of exhaustion on Christmas Day aged 6. He was buried in Palermo soon after the family arrived there; his funeral was the first official engagement his family attended in Sicly. He died on the same day as his cousin Maria Amalia of Austria.

Ancestry

References and notes

1792 births
1798 deaths
18th-century Neapolitan people
Neapolitan princes
Sicilian princes
Italian Roman Catholics
18th-century Roman Catholics
Monarchs of Naples
Royalty and nobility who died as children
Sons of kings